Janssen Vaccines, formerly Crucell, is a biotechnology company specializing in vaccines and biopharmaceutical technologies.
It was formed when Johnson & Johnson acquired the Dutch biotech company Crucell based in Leiden and placed it in their pharmaceutical division.


History
In 1993 Introgene, Crucell’s predecessor, was established as a spin-off of Leiden University. The company formed a partnership with Genzyme to collaborate on its vector technology and viral-based products. In 1999 the company founded Galapagos Genomics as a joint venture together with Tibotec. In 2000 IntroGene acquired U-Bisys to form Crucell.

In 2006, Crucell and Swiss Berna Biotech; Swedish SBL Vaccines and US-based Berna Products joined forces to become the sixth largest vaccine company worldwide, with their own clinical programs.

On 7 January 2009 Crucell released a press release saying Crucell and Wyeth were in discussion on a merger of the two companies. On 26 January 2009 Crucell released another press release saying the discussions on a combination of Crucell and Wyeth was discontinued due to Pfizer's acquisition of Wyeth.

In September 2009 Johnson & Johnson bought 18% stake in Crucell for €302 million in order to collaborate on the development of a flu vaccine. This followed Crucell's discovery of CR6261, a potent human antibody that neutralizes a broad range of influenza A viruses. J&J acquired the rest of the company in October 2010, taking its stake to over 95% by February 2011 and delisting the company from stock exchanges two months later.

After the takeover by Johnson & Johnson in 2011, Crucell was assigned to Janssen Pharmaceuticals division. In 2014, the subsidiary was renamed from Crucell to Janssen Vaccines.

COVID-19 vaccine development 

Janssen Vaccines in Leiden developed the COVID-19 vaccines for Johnson & Johnson. Initial production of the vaccine is happening at Janssen Biotech in Leiden, Netherlands. The vaccine stands out because it is the first single-shot vaccine against COVID-19 that was developed during the COVID-19 pandemic.

References

University spin-offs
Johnson & Johnson subsidiaries
Companies based in South Holland
Biotechnology companies of the Netherlands
Biotechnology companies established in 2000
2000 establishments in the Netherlands
2009 mergers and acquisitions
Vaccine producers
COVID-19 vaccine producers